CHK HD (stylized as cHK HD) is a Southeast Asian pay television channel owned by Celestial Tiger Entertainment and billed as a Hong Kong general entertainment hub featuring movies, lifestyle programs and dramas for all Singtel TV customers in Singapore. The high-definition channel was launched on 18 October 2013 with Hong Kong celebrities Bernice Liu, Him Law and Liu Kai Chi.

The channel was continued to be operated as Video on Demand channel, awhile CHK live channel has been replaced by its sister channel Celestial Movies as CM+, which served as alternative to Star Chinese Movies.

Programming blocks
The channel's programming consists of movies, television series, travel documentaries, and news roundups from Hong Kong.

Saturday Night Blockbuster

CHK HD premieres the latest Hong Kong blockbuster movies, notably released theatrically within the past 12 months, in a weekly evening time slot every Saturday at 9PM SGT/MAL-8PM JKT. Programs airing in this block include Unbeatable, Switch, Out of Inferno, The Guillotines, and Christmas Rose.

Sunday Drama Night

Drama series tackling cultural, societal, and political issues in Hong Kong are shown every Sunday at 9PM SGT/MAL-8PM JKT. Programs airing in this block include Hope and Despair, F.S.D., Ombudsman Special, The Moment, and I.T. Champions.

Weekday Primetime Movies

Repeat showings and classic screenings of notable Hong Kong movie hits air Monday through Friday at 9PM SGT/MAL-8PM JKT. Programs airing in this block include Initial D, Infernal Affairs, Confession of Pain, My Young Auntie, and Ip Man.

C Nights

A signature time-belt focused on scary, violent, and risque shows air Monday through Friday at 10PM SGT/MAL-9PM JKT, Saturday and Sunday at 11PM SGT/MAL-10PM JKT. Programs airing in this block include Magic Beauty, The Unbelievable, Career of Seven Ladies, and SFC in Action.

References

External links

2013 establishments in Singapore
Lionsgate subsidiaries
Television channels and stations established in 2013
Television stations in Singapore
HD-only channels